Flint is the largest city and seat of Genesee County, Michigan, United States. At the 2020 census, Flint had a population of 81,252, making it the twelfth largest city in Michigan. The Flint metropolitan area is located entirely within Genesee County. It is the fourth largest metropolitan area in Michigan with a population of 406,892 in 2020. The city was incorporated in 1855.

Flint was founded as a village by fur trader Jacob Smith in 1819 and became a major lumbering area on the historic Saginaw Trail during the 19th century. From the late 19th century to the mid 20th century, the city was a leading manufacturer of carriages and later automobiles, earning it the nickname "Vehicle City". General Motors (GM) was founded in Flint in 1908, and the city grew into an automobile manufacturing powerhouse for GM's Buick and Chevrolet divisions, especially after World War II up until the early 1980s recession. Flint was also the home of a sit-down strike in 1936–37 that played a vital role in the formation of the United Auto Workers.

Since the late 1960s, Flint has faced several crises. The city experienced an economic downturn after GM significantly downsized its workforce in the area from a high of 80,000 in 1978 to under 8,000 by 2010. From 1960 to 2010, the population of the city nearly halved, from 196,940 to 102,434. In the mid-2000s, Flint became known for its comparatively high crime rates and has repeatedly been ranked among the most dangerous cities in the United States according to crime statistics. The city was under a state of financial emergency from 2002 to 2004 and again from 2011 to 2015.

From 2014 to 2019, Flint faced a public health emergency due to lead contamination in parts of the local water supply as well as an outbreak of Legionnaires' disease. The acute lead crisis has been addressed as the city has secured a new source of clean water, installed modern copper pipes to nearly every home, and distributed filters to all residents who want them. However, a legacy of distrust in public authorities remains.

History
The region was home to several Ojibwe tribes at the start of the 19th century, with a particularly significant community established near present-day Montrose. The Flint River had several convenient fords which became points of contention among rival tribes, as attested by the presence of nearby arrowheads and burial mounds. Some of the city currently resides atop ancient Ojibwe burial grounds.

19th century: lumber and the beginnings of the automobile industry
In 1819, Jacob Smith, a fur trader on cordial terms with both the local Ojibwe and the territorial government, founded a trading post at the Grand Traverse of the Flint River. On several occasions, Smith negotiated land exchanges with the Ojibwe on behalf of the U.S. government, and he was highly regarded on both sides. Smith apportioned many of his holdings to his children. As the ideal stopover on the overland route between Detroit and Saginaw, Flint grew into a small but prosperous village and incorporated in 1855. The 1860 U.S. census indicated that Genesee County had a population of 22,498 of Michigan's 750,000.

In the latter half of the 19th century, Flint became a center of the Michigan lumber industry. Revenue from lumber funded the establishment of a local carriage-making industry. As horse-drawn carriages gave way to the automobiles, Flint then naturally grew into a major player in the nascent auto industry. Buick Motor Company, after a rudimentary start in Detroit, soon moved to Flint.  AC Spark Plug originated in Flint.  These were followed by several now-defunct automobile marques such as the Dort, Little, Flint, and Mason brands.  Chevrolet's first (and for many years, main) manufacturing facility was also in Flint, although the Chevrolet headquarters were in Detroit.  For a brief period, all Chevrolets and Buicks were built in Flint.

The first Ladies' Library Association in Michigan was started in Flint in 1851 in the home of Maria Smith Stockton, daughter of the founder of the community. This library, initially private, is considered the precursor of the current Flint Public Library.

Early and mid-20th century: the auto industry takes shape

In 1904, local entrepreneur William C. Durant was brought in to manage Buick, which became the largest manufacturer of automobiles by 1908. In 1908, Durant founded General Motors (GM), filing incorporation papers in New Jersey, with headquarters in Flint. GM moved its headquarters to Detroit in the mid-1920s. Durant lost control of GM twice during his lifetime. On the first occasion, he befriended Louis Chevrolet and founded Chevrolet, which was a runaway success. He used the capital from this success to buy back share control. He later lost decisive control again, permanently. Durant experienced financial ruin in the stock market crash of 1929 and subsequently ran a bowling alley in Flint until the time of his death in 1947.

The city's mayors were targeted for recall twice, Mayor David Cuthbertson in 1924 and Mayor William H. McKeighan in 1927. Recall supporters in both cases were jailed by the police. Cuthbertson had angered the Ku Klux Klan (KKK) by the appointment of a Catholic police chief. The KKK led the recall effort and supported Judson Transue, Cutbertson's elected successor. Transue however did not remove the police chief.  McKeighan survived his recall only to face conspiracy charges in 1928. McKeighan was under investigation for a multitude of crimes which angered city leaders enough to push for changes in the city charter.

In 1928, the city adopted a new city charter with a council-manager form of government. Subsequently, McKeighan ran the "Green Slate" of candidates who won in 1931 and 1932 and he was select as mayor in 1931. In 1935, the city residents approved a charter amendment establishing the Civil Service Commission.

For the last century, Flint's history has been dominated by both the auto industry and car culture. During the Sit-Down Strike of 1936–1937, the fledgling United Automobile Workers triumphed over General Motors, inaugurating the era of labor unions. The successful mediation of the strike by Governor Frank Murphy, culminating in a one-page agreement recognizing the Union, began an era of successful organizing by the UAW.  The city was a major contributor of tanks and other war machines during World War II due to its extensive manufacturing facilities.  For decades, Flint remained politically significant as a major population center as well as for its importance to the automotive industry.

A freighter named after the city, the SS City of Flint, was the first US ship to be captured during the Second World War, in October 1939. The vessel was later sunk in 1943. On June 8, 1953, the Flint-Beecher tornado, a large F5 tornado, struck the city, killing 116 people.

The city's population peaked in 1960 at almost 200,000, at which time it was the second largest city in the state. The decades of the 1950s and 1960s are seen as the height of Flint's prosperity and influence. They culminated with the establishment of many local institutions, most notably the Flint Cultural Center. This landmark remains one of the city's chief commercial and artistic draws to this day. The city's Bishop International Airport was the busiest in Michigan for United Airlines apart from Detroit Metropolitan Airport, with flights to many destinations in the Mid-West and the Mid-Atlantic.

Late 20th century: deindustrialization and demographic changes
Since the late 1960s through the end of the 20th century, Flint has suffered from disinvestment, deindustrialization, depopulation and urban decay, as well as high rates of crime, unemployment and poverty. Initially, this took the form of "white flight" that afflicted many urban industrialized American towns and cities.  Given Flint's role in the automotive industry, this decline was exacerbated by the 1973 oil crisis with spiking oil prices and the U.S. auto industry's subsequent loss of market share to imports, as Japanese manufacturers were producing cars with better fuel economy.

In the 1980s, the rate of deindustrialization accelerated again with local GM employment falling from a 1978 high of 80,000 to under 8,000 by 2010. Only 10% of the manufacturing work force from its height remains in Flint. Many factors have been blamed, including outsourcing, offshoring, increased automation, and moving jobs to non-union facilities in right to work states and foreign countries.

This decline was highlighted in the film Roger & Me by Michael Moore (the title refers to Roger B. Smith, the CEO of General Motors during the 1980s). Also highlighted in Moore's documentary was the failure of city officials to reverse the trends with entertainment options (e.g. the now-demolished AutoWorld) during the 1980s. Moore, a native of Davison (a Flint suburb), revisited Flint in his later movies, including Bowling for Columbine, Fahrenheit 9/11
and Fahrenheit 11/9

21st century

First financial emergency: 2002–2004
By 2002, Flint had accrued $30 million in debt. On March 5, 2002, the city's voters recalled Mayor Woodrow Stanley. On May 22, Governor John Engler declared a financial emergency in Flint, and on July 8 the state appointed an emergency financial manager, Ed Kurtz.  The emergency financial manager displaced the temporary mayor, Darnell Earley, in the city administrator position.

In August 2002, city voters elected former Mayor James Rutherford to finish the remainder of Stanley's term of office.  On September 24,  Kurtz commissioned a salary and wage study for top city officials from an outside accounting and consulting firm.  The financial manager then installed a new code enforcement program for annual rental inspections and emergency demolitions.  On October 8, Kurtz ordered cuts in pay for the mayor (from $107,000 to $24,000) and the City Council members (from $23,000 to $18,000).  He also eliminated insurance benefits for most officials.  After spending $245,000 fighting the takeover, the City Council ended the lawsuits on October 14.  Immediately thereafter on October 16, a new interim financial plan was put in place by the manager.  This plan initiated controls on hiring, overnight travel and spending by city employees.  On November 12, Kurtz directed the city's retirement board to stop unusual pension benefits, which had decreased some retiree pensions by 3.5%.  Kurtz sought the return of overpayments to the pension fund.  However, in December, the state attorney general stated that emergency financial managers do not have authority over the retirement system.  With contract talks stalled, Kurtz stated that there either need to be cuts or layoffs to union employees.  That same month, the city's recreation centers were temporarily closed.

Emergency measures continued in 2003.  In May, Kurtz increased water and sewer bills by 11% and shut down operations of the ombudsman's office.  In September, a 4% pay cut was agreed to by the city's largest union.  In October, Kurtz moved in favor of infrastructure improvements, authorizing $1 million in sewer and road projects. Don Williamson was elected a full-term mayor and sworn in on November 10.  In December, city audits reported nearly $14 million in reductions in the city deficit.  For the 2003–2004 budget year, estimates decreased that amount to between $6 million and $8 million.

With pressure from Kurtz for large layoffs and replacement of the board on February 17, 2004, the City Retirement Board agreed to four proposals reducing the amount of the city's contribution into the system.  On March 24, Kurtz indicated that he would raise the City Council's and the mayor's pay, and in May, Kurtz laid off 10 workers as part of 35 job cuts for the 2004–05 budget.  In June 2004, Kurtz reported that the financial emergency was over.

Redevelopment

In November 2013, American Cast Iron Pipe Company, a Birmingham, Alabama based company, became the first to build a production facility in Flint's former Buick City site, purchasing the property from the RACER Trust. Commercially, local organizations have attempted to pool their resources in the central business district and to expand and bolster higher education at four local institutions.  Examples of their efforts include the following:
  Landmarks such as the First National Bank building have been extensively renovated, often to create lofts or office space, and filming for the Will Ferrell movie Semi-Pro resulted in renovations to the Capitol Theatre.
 The Paterson Building at Saginaw and Third street has been owned by the Collison Family, Thomas W. Collison & Co., Inc., for the last 30 years.  The building is rich in Art Deco throughout the interior and exterior.  The building also houses its own garage in the lower level, providing heated valet parking to The Paterson Building Tenants.

 In 2004, University Park, the first planned residential community in Flint in over 30 years, was built north of Fifth Avenue off Saginaw Street, Flint's main thoroughfare.
 Local foundations have funded the renovation and redecoration of Saginaw Street and have begun work turning University Avenue (formerly known as Third Avenue) into a mile-long "University Corridor" connecting University of Michigan–Flint with Kettering University.
Atwood Stadium, located on University Avenue, received extensive renovations, and the Cultivating Our Community project  landscaped 16 different locations as a part of a $415,600 beautification project.
 Wade Trim and Rowe Incorporated made major renovations to transform empty downtown Flint blocks into business, entertainment, and housing centers. WNEM-TV, a television station based in Saginaw, uses space in the Wade Trim building facing Saginaw Street as a secondary studio and newsroom.
 The long-vacant Durant Hotel, formerly owned by the United Hotels Company, was turned into a mixture of commercial space and apartments intended to attract young professionals or college students, with 93 units.
 In March 2008, the Crim Race Foundation put up an offer to buy the vacant Character Inn and turn it into a fitness center and do a multimillion-dollar renovation.

Similar to a plan in Detroit, Flint is in the process of tearing down thousands of abandoned homes to create available real estate. As of June 2009, approximately 1,100 homes have been demolished in Flint, with one official estimating another 3,000 more will have to be torn down.

Second financial emergency: 2011–2015
On September 30, 2011, Governor Rick Snyder appointed an eight-member team to review Flint's financial state with a request to report back in 30 days (half the legal time for a review).  On November 8, Mayor Dayne Walling defeated challenger Darryl Buchanan 8,819 votes (56%) to 6,868 votes (44%).  That same day, the Michigan State review panel declared Flint to be in a state of a "local government financial emergency" recommending the state again appoint an emergency manager.  On November 14, the City Council voted 7 to 2 to not appeal the state review with Mayor Walling concurring the next day.  Governor Snyder appointed Michael Brown as the city's emergency manager.  On December 2, Brown dismissed a number of top administrators. Pay and benefits from Flint's elected officials were automatically removed.   On December 8, the office of ombudsman and the Civil Service Commission were eliminated by Brown.

On January 16, 2012, protestors against the emergency manager law including Flint residents marched near the governor's home.  The next day, Brown filed a financial and operating plan with the state as mandated by law.  The next month, each ward in the city had a community engagement meeting hosted by Brown.  Governor Snyder on March 7 made a statewide public safety message from Flint City Hall that included help for Flint with plans for reopening the Flint lockup and increasing state police patrols in Flint.

On March 20, 2012, days after a lawsuit was filed by labor union AFSCME, and a restraining order was issued against Brown, his appointment was found to be in violation of the Michigan Open Meetings Act, and Mayor Walling and the City Council had their powers returned. The state immediately filed an emergency appeal, claiming the financial emergency still existed. On March 26, the appeal was granted, putting Brown back in power. Brown and several unions agreed to new contract terms in April. Brown unveiled his fiscal year 2013 budget on April 23. It included cuts in nearly every department including police and fire, as well as higher taxes. An Obsolete Property Rehabilitation District was created by Manager Brown in June 2012 for 11 downtown Flint properties. On July 19, the city pension system was transferred to the Municipal Employees Retirement System by the city's retirement board which led to a legal challenge.

On August 3, 2012, the Michigan Supreme Court ordered the state Board of Canvassers to certify a referendum on Public Act 4, the Emergency Manager Law, for the November ballot.  Brown made several actions on August 7 including placing a $6 million public safety millage on the ballot and sold Genesee Towers to a development group for $1 to demolish the structure.  The board certified the referendum petition on August 8, returning the previous Emergency Financial Manager Law into effect.  With Brown previously temporary mayor for the last few years, he was ineligible to be the Emergency Financial Manager. Ed Kurtz was once again appointed Emergency Financial Manager by the Emergency Financial Assistance Loan Board.

Two lawsuits were filed in September 2012, one by the city council against Kurtz's appointment, while another was against the state in Ingham County Circuit Court claiming the old emergency financial manager law remains repealed.  On November 30, State Treasurer Andy Dillon announced the financial emergency was still ongoing, and the emergency manager was still needed.

Michael Brown was re-appointed Emergency Manager on June 26, 2013, and returned to work on July 8. Flint had an $11.3 million projected deficit when Brown started as emergency manager in 2011. The city faced a $19.1 million combined deficit from 2012, with plans to borrow $12 million to cover part of it. Brown resigned from his position in early September 2013, and his last day was October 31. He was succeeded by Saginaw city manager (and former Flint temporary mayor) Darnell Earley.

Earley formed a blue ribbon committee on governance with 23 members on January 16, 2014, to review city operations and consider possible charter amendments. The blue ribbon committee recommend that the city move to a council-manager government. Proposals which would eliminate certain executive departments, the Civil Service Commission and the ombudsman office were defeated. Flint elected a nine-member Charter Review Commission on May 5, 2015.

On , the state moved the city from under an emergency manager receivership to a Receivership Transition Advisory Board. On November 3, 2015, Flint residents elected Karen Weaver as their first female mayor. On January 22, 2016, the Receivership Transition Advisory Board unanimously voted to return some powers, including appointment authority, to the mayor. The Receivership Transit Authority Board was formally dissolved by State Treasurer Nick Khouri on April 10, 2018, returning the city to local control.

Water state of emergency

In April 2014, Flint switched its water supply from Lake Huron (via Detroit) to the Flint River. The problem was compounded with the fact that anticorrosive measures were not implemented. After two independent studies, lead poisoning caused by the water was found in the area's population. This has led to several lawsuits, the resignation of several officials, fifteen criminal indictments, and a federal public health state of emergency for all of Genesee County.

Geography

Flint lies in the Flint/Tri-Cities region of Michigan. Flint and Genesee County can be categorized as a subregion of Flint/Tri-Cities.

Flint lies just to the northeast of the Flint hills. The terrain is low and rolling along the south and east sides, and flatter to the northwest.

Neighborhoods
Flint has several neighborhoods grouped around the center of the city on the four cardinal sides. The downtown business district is centered on Saginaw Street south of the Flint River. Just west, on opposite sides of the river, are Carriage Town (north) and the Grand Traverse Street District (south). Both neighborhoods boast strong neighborhood associations. These neighborhoods were the center of manufacturing for and profits from the nation's carriage industry until the 1920s and are the site of many well-preserved Victorian homes and the setting of Atwood Stadium.

The University Avenue corridor of Carriage Town is home to the largest concentration of Greek housing in the area, with fraternity houses from both Kettering University, and the University of Michigan-Flint. Chapter houses include Phi Delta Theta, Sigma Alpha Epsilon, Delta Chi, Theta Chi, Lambda Chi Alpha, Theta Xi, Alpha Phi Alpha, Phi Gamma Delta, and Delta Tau Delta Fraternities.

Just north of downtown is River Village, an example of gentrification via mixed-income public housing. To the east of I-475 is Central Park and Fairfield Village.  These are the only two neighborhoods between UM-Flint and Mott Community College and enjoy strong neighborhood associations. Central Park piloted a project to convert street lights to LED and is defined by seven cul-de-sacs.

The North Side and 5th Ward are predominantly African American, with such historic districts as Buick City and Civic Park on the north, and Sugar Hill, Floral Park, and Kent and Elm Parks on the south. Many of these neighborhoods were the original centers of early Michigan blues. The South Side in particular was also a center for multi-racial migration from Missouri, Kentucky, Tennessee, and the Deep South since World War II. These neighborhoods are most often lower income but have maintained some level of economic stratification. The East Side is the site of the Applewood Mott Estate, and Mott Community College, the Cultural Center, and East Village, one of Flint's more prosperous areas. The surrounding neighborhood is called the College/Cultural Neighborhood, with a strong neighborhood association, lower crime rate and stable housing prices.

Just north is Eastside Proper, also known as the State Streets, and has much of Flint's Hispanic community.
The West Side includes the main site of the 1936–37 sit-down strike, the Mott Park neighborhood, Kettering University, and the historic Woodcroft Estates, owned in the past by legendary automotive executives and current home to prominent and historic Flint families such as the Motts, the Manleys, and the Smiths.

Facilities associated with General Motors in the past and present are scattered throughout the city, including GM Truck and Bus, Flint Metal Center and Powertrain South (clustered together on the city's southwestern corner); Powertrain North, Flint Tool and Die and Delphi East. The largest plant, Buick City, and adjacent facilities have been demolished.

Half of Flint's fourteen tallest buildings were built during the 1920s. The 19-story Genesee Towers, formerly the city's tallest building, was completed in 1968. The building became unused in later years and fell into severe disrepair: a cautionary sign warning of falling debris was put on the sidewalk in front of it. An investment company purchased the building for $1, and it was demolished (by implosion) on December 22, 2013.

Climate
Typical of southeastern Michigan, Flint has a humid continental climate (Köppen Dfb), and is part of USDA Hardiness zone 6a. The average window for freezing temperatures is October 8 thru May 7, allowing a growing season of 153 days. On June 8, 1953, Flint was hit by an F5 tornado, which claimed 116 lives.

Demographics

2020 census

2010 Census
As of the census of 2010, there were 102,434 people, 40,472 households, and 23,949 families residing in the city. The racial makeup of the city was 56.6% African American, 37.4% White, 0.5% Native American, 0.5% Asian, 1.1% from other races, and 3.9% from two or more races. Hispanic or Latino of any race were 3.9% of the population. Non-Hispanic Whites were 35.7% of the population in 2010, compared to 70.1% in 1970.

There were 40,472 households, of which 34.3% had children under the age of 18 living with them, 23.1% were married couples living together, 29.0% had a female householder with no husband present, 7.1% had a male householder with no wife present, and 40.8% were non-families. 33.9% of all households were made up of individuals, and 9.8% had someone living alone who was 65 years of age or older. The average household size was 2.45 and the average family size was 3.13.

The median age in the city was 33.6 years. 27.3% of residents were under the age of 18; 11.3% were between the ages of 18 and 24; 25.5% were from 25 to 44; 25.1% were from 45 to 64; and 10.7% were 65 years of age or older. The gender makeup of the city was 48.0% male and 52.0% female.

In 2016, Niraj Warikoo of the Detroit Free Press stated that area community leaders stated that the Hispanic and Latino people made up close to 6% of the city population, while the city also had 142 Arab-American families. According to the most recent data from the U.S. Census Bureau, slightly over 1% of Flint's population was born outside the U.S., and over three-quarters of that foreign-born population have become naturalized citizens.

Government

The city levies an income tax of 1 percent on residents and 0.5 percent on nonresidents.  The 1974 Charter is the city's current charter that gives the city a strong mayor form of government. It also instituted the appointed independent office of Ombudsman, while the city clerk is solely appointed by the city council. The city council is composed of members elected from the city's nine wards.  A Charter Review Commission is currently impaneled to review the charter for a complete overhaul. The city operated under state-led financial receivership from April 30, 2015, to April 10, 2018, which saw the city under an Emergency Manager as the State of Michigan had declared a state of local government financial emergency. The Receivership Transition Advisory Board had the authority to override council decisions related to financial matters. The city has operated under at least four charters (1855, 1888, 1929, 1974).

Law enforcement

Law enforcement in Flint is the responsibility of the Flint Police Department, the Genesee County Sheriff's Office, and the Michigan State Police. Flint has been consistently ranked as one of the most dangerous cities in the United States by multiple sources. From 2007 to 2009, violent crime in Flint was ranked in the top five among U.S. cities with a population of at least 50,000 people. From 2010 to 2012, Flint ranked as the city with the highest violent crime rate among cities with over 100,000 population. In 2015, CQ Press (using FBI statistics) ranked the crime index for Flint as seventh-highest in cities with population greater than 75,000. In 2018, the FBI reported Flint was ranked as America's sixth most violent city among those with population of 50,000 or more in 2017. Violent crimes were up 23% compared to 2016 according to the report.

Politics
Most politicians are affiliated with the Democratic party despite the city's elections being nonpartisan. In 2006, Flint was the tenth most liberal city in the United States, according to a nationwide study by the non-partisan Bay Area Center for Voting Research, which examined the voting patterns of 237 cities with a population over 100,000.

The city elected Karen Weaver as its first female mayor in 2015. She was succeeded in 2020 by Sheldon Neeley.

Sports

American football
There is semi-pro football at Atwood Stadium with the Flint Fury. Atwood is an 11,000+ seat stadium in downtown Flint which has hosted many events, including baseball. When artificial turf was installed, it was no longer able to host baseball games. The Flint Fury have been in action since 2003, and are currently a part of the Great Lakes Football League. The team was founded by two of its players; Charles Lawler and Prince Goodson, who both played for the defunct Flint Falcons semi-pro team. The team is now solely owned by Lawler.

The 2009 Heisman Trophy winner Mark Ingram II, born and raised in Grand Blanc, attended his final year of high school at Flint Southwestern Academy. He won the Heisman with 1304 total votes. Ingram attended the University of Alabama and is their first Heisman winner. He was a member of the National Champion 2009 Alabama Crimson Tide football team.

Basketball
Many Flint natives have played basketball in the National Basketball Association (NBA), NCAA Division 1 or European professional basketball. NBA champion Glen Rice, Eddie Robinson and three-time NBA champion JaVale McGee, and Washington Wizards forward Kyle Kuzma all hail from Flint, as do Morris Peterson, Mateen Cleaves, and Charlie Bell (four of the five starters from Michigan State University's "Flintstones" 2000 National Championship team).

Local teacher and independent film maker Marcus Davenport chronicles Flint's ties to basketball and the basketball culture in his documentary Flint Star: The Motion Picture. Will Ferrell's 2008 movie Semi-Pro is based on the fictional basketball team the "Flint Tropics".

Ice hockey
On January 14, 2015, the Ontario Hockey League's Plymouth Whalers were relocated to Flint after a sale of the team to the owner of Perani Arena for the 2015–16 season. The team changed its name to the Flint Firebirds.

Other sports
Flint is twinned with Hamilton, Ontario, and its amateur athletes compete in the CANUSA Games, held alternatively between the two cities since 1957.

Former sports teams

Infrastructure

Bus lines
The city of Flint is served by various bus lines. For travel within and around the city, the Flint Mass Transportation Authority (MTA) provides local bus services. Indian Trails provides inter-city bus service north to Saint Ignace, through Bay City and south to Pontiac, Southfield, and Detroit, and runs services west to Chicago.  MTA's main hub is in Downtown Flint, while the Indian Trails station is co-located at the Flint Amtrak station on Dort Highway, just north of I-69.

Major highways
  runs east and west through Flint.
  runs north and south through the southwestern part of the city near the General Motors Flint Assembly complex and Bishop International Airport.
  runs north and south through Flint.
  (also known as Corunna Road and Court Street) runs nearly due east and west through Flint, west of I-475
 , also known as Dort Highway after Flint automotive pioneer Josiah Dallas Dort, runs north and south through the eastern part of the city.

Railroads

Amtrak provides intercity passenger rail service on the Blue Water line from Chicago to Port Huron at the border to Canada. The Amtrak station is located on Dort Highway, just north of I-69. The station was built in 1989 and replaced an earlier Grand Trunk Western Railroad (GTW) station closer to downtown. Canadian National Railway (GTW's successor) and Lake State Railway provide freight service to Flint, with CN operating from Bristol Yard on the western side of the city and LSRC operating from the former CSX Transportation McGrew Yard to the north. While CSX ceded control of their former Saginaw Subdivision north of Plymouth to LSRC in 2019, they continue to operate trackage rights trains over CN from Flint to Port Huron several times per week as of 2020. Into the late 1940s, the Pere Marquette Railway operated daily passenger trains through a separate station  miles away, with trains heading north to Saginaw and Bay City and south to Detroit's Fort Street Union Depot.

Airports
Flint is served by three passenger and two cargo airlines at Bishop International Airport. It is located on Bristol Road between I-75 and I-69. Dalton Airport, a public use airport near Flushing, also serves small, privately owned planes. Price's Airport in Linden serves the same purpose.

Healthcare
 Hurley Medical Center
 McLaren Regional Medical Center
 Flint once had two other full service hospitals: St. Joseph's Hospital and Flint Osteopathic Hospital (FOH). In 1988, HealthSource Group, the parent company of FOH, became affiliated with St. Joseph Health Systems. In 1992, St. Joseph Health Systems changed its name to Genesys Health System and the names of its four hospitals to Genesys Regional Medical Center (GRMC). On February 15, 1997, all the former GHS hospitals were consolidated into one hospital at Genesys Regional Medical Center at Health Park in suburban Grand Blanc Township (now owned by Ascension Health who later changed its name to Ascension Genesys Hospital) and Flint Osteopathic Hospital was razed during the Spring/Summer of 2015.

Education

Colleges and universities
 University of Michigan–Flint
 Kettering University
 Mott Community College
 Michigan State University College of Human Medicine
 Baker College

Primary and secondary schools
Public K-12 education is provided under the umbrella of the Flint Community Schools.  Students attend ten elementary schools, one middle school, and one high school (Flint Southwestern Academy). The city's original high school, Flint Central High School, was closed in 2009 because of a budget deficit and a lack of maintenance on the building by the Flint School District. The building, however, still stands. Flint Northern High School was converted to an alternative education school at the start of the 2013–14 school year and was closed later in 2014. The state-run Michigan School for the Deaf is located in Flint, and Michigan School for the Blind was previously there, having moved from Lansing in 1995.

The Catholic high school is Fr. Luke M. Powers Catholic High School which is part of the Roman Catholic Diocese of Lansing and serves the entire county. The school moved from its location just north of Flint in Mt. Morris Township in 2013 into the former Michigan School for the Deaf building off of Miller Road in Flint, which received a $22 million renovation. The Valley School is a small private K–12 school. Flint also has several charter schools.

Libraries
The Flint Public Library holds 454,645 books, 22,355 audio materials, 9,453 video materials, and 2,496 serial subscriptions.

Media

Print
The county's largest newspaper is The Flint Journal, which dates back to 1876. Effective June 2009 the paper ceased to be a daily publication, opting to publish on Thursdays, Fridays and Sundays. The move made Genesee County the largest county in the United States without a daily newspaper. The Flint Journal began publishing a Tuesday edition in March 2010.
The East Village Magazine is a non-profit news magazine providing information about neighborhood issues since 1976. The monthly magazine centers on the East Village neighborhood, outside downtown Flint, but is distributed throughout the city.  The Uncommon Sense was a recent publication featuring critical journalism, satirical cartoons, and articles on music and nightlife, but it ceased publishing in 2007. In January 2009, Broadside became the current independent newspaper, exclusively available in print. In early 2009 Flint Comix & Entertainment began circulating around college campuses, and local businesses. This monthly publication features local and nationally recognized comic artists, as well as editorials, and other news.

Two quarterly magazines have appeared in recent years: Innovative Health Magazine and Downtown Flint Revival Magazine. Debuting in 2008, Innovative Health highlights the medical advancements, health services and lifestyles happening in and around Genesee County, while Downtown Flint Revival reports on new developments, building renovations and the many businesses in the Downtown area. A new monthly magazine which began publishing in June 2013 is known as My City Magazine which highlights events, arts and culture in Genesee County.
Online news source, FlintBeat.com was launched in 2017 by Flint-area native, Jiquanda Johnson. The hyper local news website focuses on Flint City Hall, solutions journalism and public health in addition to their work covering neighborhoods and telling community stories.
University publications include University of Michigan–Flint's student newspaper The Michigan Times, Kettering University's The Technician and the MCC Chronicle, formerly the MCC Post, which is a monthly magazine from Mott Community College.

Television
WJRT-TV (ABC), formerly one of ten ABC owned-and-operated stations, is currently the only area station to operate from Flint. WSMH (Fox) is licensed to Flint, but its programming originates from outside of Flint proper (the suburb Mt. Morris Township), WEYI (NBC), licensed to Saginaw, and WBSF (The CW), licensed to Bay City, share studios with WSMH. Other stations outside the Flint area that serve the area include Saginaw-based WNEM-TV (CBS) (which has a news bureau in Downtown Flint), Delta College's WDCQ-TV (PBS), and Saginaw's WAQP (TCT).

TV stations

Radio
The Flint radio market has a rich history. WAMM-AM 1420 (started in 1955, now gospel station WFLT) on the city's eastside was one of the first stations in the country to program to the black community and was also where legendary DJ Casey Kasem had his first radio job. WTAC-AM 600 (now religious station WSNL) was a highly rated and influential Top 40 station in the 1960s and 1970s, showcasing Michigan artists and being the first in the U.S. to play acts like The Who and AC/DC. WTAC changed its format to country music in 1980 and then became a pioneering contemporary Christian music station a few years later; the calls are now on 89.7 FM, a member of the "Smile FM" network.  WTRX-AM 1330 also played Top 40 music for a time in the 1960s and '70s. The city's first radio station, AM 910 WFDF, first went on the air in 1922. It has since relocated south into the Detroit market, changing its city of license to Farmington Hills and increasing its power to 50,000 watts.

AM stations

FM stations

Sister cities

 Changchun, Jilin, China
 Hamilton, Ontario, Canada
 Kielce, Świętokrzyskie Voivodeship, Poland
 Tolyatti, Samara Oblast, Russia

Books
The following notable books are set in Flint or relate to the city.

Fiction
 The Watsons Go to Birmingham - 1963 by Christopher Paul Curtis
 Bud, Not Buddy by Christopher Paul Curtis
 Elijah of Buxton by Christopher Paul Curtis
 The Mighty Miss Malone by Christopher Paul Curtis
 Daddy Cool by Donald Goines

Non-Fiction
 What the Eyes Don't See by Dr. Mona Hanna-Attisha
 Hanging On by Edmund G. Love
 Teardown: Memoir of a Vanishing City by Gordon Young (Journalist)

Music

 Flint is the subject of the Sufjan Stevens song "Flint (For the Unemployed and Underpaid)" featured on his album Michigan.
 Flint is the main focus for music group King 810 crediting it as “Murder Town” and their life growing up during the increase of crime rates during the 2000s. Also creating the songs “Crow's Feet” and “We Gotta Help Ourselves” to raise money toward the current water crisis happening in the city
 Flint was home to MC Breed, the first commercially successful rapper to come from the Midwest.
Kansas City rapper Tech N9ne mentioned its water problems in his song "Poisoning the well"
Flint is likely the subject of "Near DT, MI" by the English rock band Black Midi.
Flint is the hometown of the award-winning Pop/RnB group Ready For The World.

Film and television
The following films and television shows have taken place or were filmed in Flint.

Television
Nash Bridges  (1996-2001  In one of the last episodes of the show the character Michelle jokes to a man soon to be sent to live in Flint through the witness protection program that the city is similar to Paris. The man, from a foreign country, does not realize she is joking and is looking forward to his arrival in Flint.
 The Fitzpatricks (1977–78) was a short-lived CBS TV drama about an Irish Catholic working-class family living in Flint. The show was filmed in Hollywood, but set in Flint. Also, the families were portrayed as steelworkers, not autoworkers.
 Flint Town (2018) a Netflix documentary about the struggling urban areas of the city.
 TV Nation (1994–1995) was the debut TV series by Michael Moore.  Numerous segments were filmed in and around Flint, including one where Moore uses declassified information to find the exact impact point from the nuclear ICBM that targeted the city (ground zero was Chevrolet Assembly, one of the General Motors plants at Bluff & Cadillac Streets).  Moore then went to Kazakhstan to try to redirect the ICBM away from Flint.
 The Awful Truth (1999–2000) was Michael Moore's second TV show.  It featured segments from Flint.
 The Flint Police Department has appeared in the 31st season of the reality show Cops, airing in the summer of 2018 and winter of 2019.
 Flint Police also appeared in a 2015 episode on TNT's Cold Justice: Sex Crimes, which paid to test old rape kits that resulted in convictions of three people for criminal sexual conduct.

Movies
 To Touch a Child (1962) A look into Community Schools, a concept pioneered by Charles Stewart Mott and spread throughout the United States.
 With Babies and Banners: Story of the Women's Emergency Brigade (1979) Documentary about the women of the Flint Sit-Down Strike.
 Roger & Me (1989) Michael Moore documentary about the economic depression in the Flint area caused by the closure of several General Motors factories in the late 1980s.
 Pets or Meat: The Return to Flint (1992) Follow-up of Roger & Me.
 The Big One (1998) Documentary film Moore urges Nike to consider building a shoe factory in Flint. Moore succeeds in convincing Nike CEO Philip Knight to match his offer to donate money to Buell Elementary School, which would eventually become the locale of the infamous Kayla Rolland shooting.
 Shattered Faith (2001) Independent (Fifth Sun Productions) written and directed by Flint native Stephen Vincent. Movie was filmed in Flint. Cast was made mostly of Flint residents but did feature Joe Estevez. Vincent's multi-year project debuted September 20, 2001 and was released directly to DVD.
 Bowling for Columbine (2002) Moore's take on the gun industry also profiles the shooting of Kayla Rolland.
 Chameleon Street (1990) Wendell B. Harris Jr.'s story of famed con man Douglas Street.  Winner of Grand Jury Prize at Sundance.
 The Real Blair Witch (2003) Documentary about group of Flint teenagers kidnapping and terrorizing a fellow student.
 The Michigan Independent (2004) Documentary film about the Michigan independent music community. Many segments were shot in Flint, particularly at the Flint Local 432.
 Fahrenheit 9/11 (2004) Moore takes on the George W. Bush administration.  Moore filmed students from Flint Southwestern Academy.  Filmed Marine recruiters at Courtland Center and references Genesee Valley Center as a mall for more wealthy citizens, "The rich mall in the suburbs." However, Courtland Center is in Burton, also a Flint suburb.
 Michael Moore Hates America (2004) Filmmaker Mike Wilson travels to Flint to document small businesses and other development efforts in the city, and compares it to the depictions of the city in Moore's documentaries.
 Flintown Kids (2005) Documentary film about violence in Flint.
 Semi-Pro (2008) Will Ferrell movie which centers around a fictitious 1970s ABA basketball team, the Flint Tropics. It was partially filmed in Flint.
 Capitalism: A Love Story (2009) A Michael Moore documentary about the negative impacts capitalism can have on people and communities.
 The Ides of March (2011) A feature film starring Ryan Gosling and George Clooney. Certain scenes were shot around downtown Flint, near the Capitol Theatre and the alley around it.
 Minor League (2011) A feature film starring Robert Miano, music artist Bone Crusher, Dustin Diamond, and Brad Leo Lyon. Numerous scenes were shot around Flint, including Atwood Stadium where the story's central Football team played their games.
 Little Creeps (2012) A feature film starring Joe Estevez, Dustin Diamond and Lark Voorhees of Saved By the Bell fame (Screech and Lisa respectively), Jake the Snake Roberts, Brad Leo Lyon, and Robert Z'Dar. Restaurant and nightclub scenes were shot at locations in Flint.
 The Watsons go to Birmingham, 1963 (2013) A movie about an African-American family who go towards Birmingham, Alabama, during the darkest moments of the civil rights movement, to teach the oldest child of the family that life isn't a joke. First half of the movie was filmed in Flint.
 Thursday the 12th (2017) A feature film starring Jenna Simms, Brad Leo Lyon, Marilyn Ghigliotti, and Brian Sutherland. Approximately half of this film was shot in Flint, Michigan while the rest of the movie wrapped in Jackson, Michigan and Savannah, Georgia.
 Don't Drink the Water (2017) A Brad Leo Lyon documentary film about the water crisis in Flint, Michigan and other communities.
 Fahrenheit 11/9 (2018) Michael Moore takes on the presidential election campaign of 2016, the victory of Donald Trump, the reasons behind the failure of the Democrats to win middle America. The Flint water crisis and the role of both political parties in creating and sustaining the crisis is highlighted.
Life in Flint, a 2018 documentary with testimonials from numerous residents about the positive aspects of the city.

Notable people

See also

 Back to the Bricks
 Citizens Republic Bancorp
 History of General Motors
 USS Flint, 3 ships

References

Further reading
 Gilman, Theodore J. No Miracles Here: Fighting Urban Decline in Japan and the United States. Albany, NY: State University of New York Press, 2001.
 Highsmith, Andrew R. Demolition Means Progress: Flint, Michigan, and the Fate of the American Metropolis. Chicago: University of Chicago Press, 2015.

External links

 
 
 Tocqueville in Flint – Segment from C-SPAN's Alexis de Tocqueville Tour
 Flint Underground Music Archive
 

 
Cities in Genesee County, Michigan
County seats in Michigan
Michigan Neighborhood Enterprise Zone
Urban decay in the United States
Populated places established in 1819
1819 in Michigan Territory